Caroline Agnès Abbé (born 13 January 1988) is a Swiss football defender. She currently plays for Servette, and for the Switzerland national team as their captain.

Career
Abbé is a former player of FC Yverdon, with whom she won two National Cups. In the 2011–12 Bundesliga summer transfer market, she signed for newly promoted SC Freiburg.

In 2014, she signed for Bayern Munich to play there until 2017. In June 2017, she returned to Switzerland to play for FC Zürich.

Honours

Yverdon Féminin
 Swiss Women's Cup (2): 2010, 2011

 Bayern München
 Bundesliga (2): 2014–15, 2015–16

FOOTBALL CAREER TRANSFERS AND STATISTICS 
We are going to show you the list of football clubs and seasons in which Caroline Abbé has played. It includes the total number of appearance (caps), substitution details, goals, yellow and red cards stats.

References

External links

 
 UEFA player profile

1988 births
Living people
Footballers from Geneva
Swiss women's footballers
Swiss expatriate sportspeople in Germany
Expatriate women's footballers in Germany
SC Freiburg (women) players
FC Bayern Munich (women) players
Switzerland women's international footballers
Women's association football defenders
FIFA Century Club
Frauen-Bundesliga players
FC Zürich Frauen players
Swiss Women's Super League players
2015 FIFA Women's World Cup players
Servette FC Chênois Féminin players
Swiss expatriate women's footballers
UEFA Women's Euro 2017 players
21st-century Swiss women